Tracy Delatte and Johan Kriek were the defending champions, but lost in quarterfinals to Mike Bauer and Steve Denton.

David Dowlen and Nduka Odizor won the title by defeating Ernie Fernández and David Pate 7–6, 7–5 in the final.

Seeds

Draw

Finals

Top half

Bottom half

References
 Official results archive (ATP)
 Official results archive (ITF)

Doubles